Julia Angela Grosso (born August 29, 2000) is a Canadian professional soccer player who plays as a midfielder for Italian Serie A club Juventus FC and the Canada women's national team. She attained international prominence after scoring the title-winning penalty kick at the 2020 Summer Olympics, leading Canada to its first gold medal.

Early life 
Grosso was born in Vancouver, British Columbia. She attended Burnaby Central Secondary where she played with the Whitecaps FC Girls Elite Rex. Grosso's sister Carli was also a member of the Vancouver Whitecaps system and played for the Simon Fraser Clan.

Grosso made her college debut for the Texas Longhorns on August 17, 2018, in a 3–0 win over the Rice Owls.

Club career

Early career 
Grosso signed with TSS FC Rovers of the Women's Premier Soccer League for the 2018 season.

Juventus 
In December 2021, Grosso returned to her ancestral country Italy and joined Italian club Juventus on an initial one-year contract. She debuted for Juventus on January 16, 2022 in a 5–0 win against Pomigliano.

International career

Youth 
On August 7, 2014, Grosso made her first junior appearance for Canada with the national under-15 against Puerto Rico in a 5–0 victory at the CONCACAF Girls Under-15 Championship. She played twelve minutes in a substitute appearance. The Canadians would go on to win the inaugural edition of the tournament in a penalty shoot-out over Haiti. Grosso would make five appearances for the under-15 national team in the tournament, the only five U-15 caps of her career.

Grosso's debut for the under-17 team came on March 3, 2016 at the CONCACAF Women's Under-17 Championship in a 3–0 win against Guatemala. Canada would finish in third place at the tournament and Grosso was named to the Best XI, en route to qualification for the 2016 FIFA U-17 Women's World Cup. Grosso proceeded to play in the 2016 FIFA U-17 Women's World Cup in Jordan. There, she played 90 minutes in all three group games, recording an assist in the first game, a 3–2 win over Cameroon. Canada would draw and lose their next games against Germany and Venezuela, respectively, resulting in a third-place finish in the group and failure to proceed from the group stage. The game against Venezuela was Grosso's last for the under-17 team.

On January 18, 2018, Grosso made her debut for the under-20 team in a 3–1 victory over Costa Rica in the opening match of the 2018 CONCACAF Women's U-20 Championship. Canada would lose the semi-finals on penalties to Mexico after a 1–1 draw after extra time. Canada needed to defeat Haiti in the third place match in order to qualify for the 2018 FIFA U-20 Women's World Cup, but lost the game 1–0 and did not qualify for the U-20 World Cup. Grosso played every minute of the five-game campaign.

Senior 
Grosso received her first call-up to the senior team under coach John Herdman for a home and home series against the United States on November 9 and 12, 2017. While Grosso did not feature in the first match, she came on as a ninetieth minute substitute for Janine Beckie in a 3–1 loss at Avaya Stadium in San Jose, California. Grosso was also a part of Canada's squad for the 2018 Algarve Cup where the team finished fifth.

Grosso was slated to make her FIFA Women's World Cup debut after being named to the Canadian squad for the 2019 edition in France. The event ended in disappointment for the Canadians, who were eliminated in the Round of 16 by the Netherlands.

After the onset of the COVID-19 pandemic delayed the 2020 Summer Olympics by a year, Grosso was named to the Canadian squad for the occasion. Canada advanced to the Olympic final for the first time in its history. On August 6, 2021, she scored the winning penalty kick in the shootout of the gold medal game against Sweden, winning Canada their first gold medal in women's soccer. This was the first time Grosso had scored on the international circuit at any level in any situation, and immediately raised her profile at home. She was by this point regarded as a rising talent, but had been continuing to have trouble finding her way into the starting lineup due to the presence of veteran Desiree Scott.

Joining the Canada national team again for the 2022 CONCACAF W Championship, Grosso scored her first international goal in the tournament opener against Trinidad and Tobago, and then managed a second goal for a brace, with Canada winning a 6–0 rout. Grosso scored the lone goal of the next game against Panama, in the process qualifying Canada for the 2023 FIFA Women's World Cup. Grosso did not play in the third group stage game, but appeared as a substitute in both the semi-final and finals. She was one of four players to score three goals in the tournament, but won the Golden Boot as top scorer due to having played the fewest minutes. She was also named to the tournament's Best XI.

Style of play 
Grosso is a left-footed mezz'ala who has creativity and technique as well as intensity and contrast and can also play as left-back.

Career statistics

Club

International

Scores and results list Canada's goal tally first, score column indicates score after each Grosso goal.

Honours 
Juventus
 Serie A: 2021–22
 Coppa Italia: 
 Supercoppa Italiana: 2021–22

Canada U15
 CONCACAF Girls' U-15 Championship: 2014

Canada
 Summer Olympics: 2020

Individual
 CONCACAF W Championship Best XI: 2022
 CONCACAF W Championship Golden Boot: 2022
 CONCACAF Women's U-17 Championship Best XI: 2016
 Vancouver Whitecaps FC Showcase All-Star: 2016 
 Vancouver Whitecaps FC Most Promising Player: 2016
 Canada Games All-Star: 2017
 BC Soccer Youth Player of the Year Female: 2018

References

External links
 
 Texas Longhorns player profile
 Vancouver Whitecaps player profile
 JuliaGrosso.com

2000 births
Living people
Soccer players from Vancouver
Canada women's international soccer players
Canadian women's soccer players
Canadian people of Italian descent
Canadian people of Portuguese descent
Women's association football midfielders
Texas Longhorns women's soccer players
Juventus F.C. (women) players
Serie A (women's football) players
Expatriate women's footballers in Italy
Canadian expatriate sportspeople in Italy
2019 FIFA Women's World Cup players
Expatriate women's soccer players in the United States
Canadian expatriate sportspeople in the United States
Canadian expatriate soccer players
Footballers at the 2020 Summer Olympics
Olympic soccer players of Canada
Olympic medalists in football
Medalists at the 2020 Summer Olympics
Olympic gold medalists for Canada
21st-century Canadian women